The 10th FINA World Junior Synchronised Swimming Championships was held 2006 in Foshan, China. The synchronised swimmers are aged between 15 and 18 years old, swimming in four events: Solo, Duet, Team and Free combination.

Participating nations

Results

References

FINA World Junior Synchronised Swimming Championships
2006 in synchronized swimming
Swimming
Jun
International aquatics competitions hosted by China
Synchronized swimming competitions in China